Philippe Violeau (born 19 September 1970) is a French former professional footballer who played as a defensive midfielder. He played exclusively in France, where he won both the national championship and the Coupe de France three times, as well as the Trophée des Champions twice and the Coupe de la Ligue once.

He was president of amateur side La Roche VF from February 2019 until June 2020.

Career
Violeau was born in Niort, Deux-Sèvres. He started playing in the 1988–89 season, with his hometown club Chamois Niortais in the French second division. In 1993, Violeau moved to top-league AJ Auxerre, where he won the 1995–96 French Division 1, and in 1997, he was transferred to Olympique Lyonnais where he played for six seasons. In 2003, Violeau returned to Auxerre, where he retired after the 2005–06 season.

Post-playing career
In February 2019, Violeau was announced as president of La Roche VF, an amateur side from his home region. He stood down after sixteen months in the position, in June 2020.

Honours
Auxerre
 French national champions: 1995–96
 Coupe de France: 1995–96, 2004–05

Lyon
 French national champions: 2001–02, 2002–03
 Coupe de la Ligue: 2000–01
 Trophée des Champions: 2002, 2003
 UEFA Intertoto Cup: 1997

References

1970 births
Living people
People from Niort
Sportspeople from Deux-Sèvres
Association football midfielders
French footballers
Chamois Niortais F.C. players
AJ Auxerre players
Olympique Lyonnais players
Ligue 1 players
Footballers from Nouvelle-Aquitaine